Augé or Auge is a surname. Notable people with the surname include:

 Claude Augé (1854–1924), French pedagogue, publisher and lexicographer
 Laura Augé (born 1992), French synchronized swimmer
 Les Auge (1953–2002), American ice hockey defenseman
 Marc Augé (born 1935), French anthropologist
 Olivier-Maurice Augé (1840–1897), Canadian politician
 Paul Augé (1881–1951), French publisher, romanist and lexicographer.
 Stéphane Augé (born 1974), French cyclist

French-language surnames